Richmond is a market town and civil parish in North Yorkshire, England, and the administrative centre of the Richmondshire district. The population at the 2011 census was 8,413.

History

The town of Richemont, in Normandy (now in the Seine-Maritime département of the Upper Normandy region), was the origin of the place name Richmond. It is the most duplicated UK place name, with 56 occurrences worldwide.

Richmond in North Yorkshire was the Honour of Richmond of the Earls of Richmond (or comtes de Richemont), a dignity also held by the Duke of Brittany from 1136 to 1399.

Richmond was founded in 1071 by Alan Rufus, a Breton nobleman, on lands granted to him by William the Conqueror, though it was called Hindrelag initially. Richmond Castle was completed in 1086 with a keep and walls encompassing the area now known as the Market Place.

Richmond was part of the lands of the earldom of Richmond, which was intermittently held by the Dukes of Brittany until the 14th century. John V, Duke of Brittany, died in 1399, and Henry IV took possession. Richmond is one of a few settlements that was spared from being raided by the Scots during The Great Raid of 1322 by bribing them off. In 1453, the earldom was conferred on Edmund Tudor, and it was merged with the crown when Edmund's son became King Henry VII in 1485. During the Wars of the Three Kingdoms, the Covenanter Army led by David Leslie, Lord Newark, took over the castle, and conflict ensued between local Catholics and Scottish Presbyterians.

Willance died in 1616.

The prosperity of the medieval town and centre of the Swaledale wool industry greatly increased in the late 17th and 18th centuries with the burgeoning lead mining industry in nearby Arkengarthdale. It is from this period that the town's Georgian architecture originates, the most notable examples of which are to be found on Newbiggin and in Frenchgate. One of Europe's first gas works was built in the town in 1830. A permanent military presence was established in the town with the completion of Richmond Barracks in 1877.

During the First World War, Richmond's own Green Howards Regiment raised 24 battalions for the war effort, the castle assumed a role as a barracks and training camp for new recruits and members of the Non-Combatant Corps, in 1915, the first troops occupied the area south of Richmond in what was to become Catterick Camp, the planning of which was commissioned by Lord Baden Powell during his residence at the town's barracks.

In 1916, a group of "absolutist" conscientious objectors known as the Richmond Sixteen were held at the castle after refusing to undertake even non-combatant military duties. After being transported to France, they were court-martialled and formally sentenced to be executed by firing squad, but this sentence was immediately commuted to ten years' penal servitude, and the men were eventually released in 1919. Richmond Castle's 19th-century cell block continued to be used to house prisoners into the Second World War.

In June 1927, Richmond was a centre line of totality during a solar eclipse, the event is marked with a plaque at the top of Reeth Road.

Governance

Local government 

Richmond is located in the eponymous district of Richmondshire, created under the Local Government Act 1972 by a merger of the municipal borough of Richmond with the rural districts of Richmond, Aysgarth, Leyburn, Reeth, and part of Croft. The town itself is split between three local government wards, Richmond East, Richmond North, and Richmond West, however the most southerly residential areas including Holly Hill and the area surrounding the former railway station are covered by the Hipswell ward, and as a result these residents are not able to elect members of the town council. The town council consists of 15 councillors elected from the three Richmond wards, a new town mayor is elected by the council members each February and taking office in May; meetings are held at Richmond Town Hall.

Parliamentary representation 

The serving member for Richmond constituency in Westminster is the current Prime Minister of the United Kingdom, Rishi Sunak of the Conservative Party, who has held the seat since 2015 when he succeeded former party leader and Foreign Secretary William Hague. In modern times it has been an ultra-safe seat for the Conservative Party with them having held it continually since 1910.

Geography 

Temperature extremes have ranged from  during August 1990, down to  during December 2010.

Demography 
According to the 2011 United Kingdom census, the parish of Richmond had a total resident population of 8,413, of which 4,374 females and 4,039 males.  95.8% of the population identified as white British, 1.4% as other white, 1.1% as Asian or Asian British, and 0.8% as black, Afro-Caribbean or black British.  The place of birth of the town's residents was 93.8% United Kingdom, 3.3% from European Union countries, and 2.5% from elsewhere in the world.  71.7% said they had religious beliefs; 70.4% of those were Christian, 1.3% is made up of all other religions, the largest being Buddhism at 0.8%, 21.4% said they had no religion.

The following table shows historic population changes in the Richmond parish area between 1801 and 1961.

Economy
As a gateway town to the Yorkshire Dales, tourism is important to the local economy, but the single largest influence is the Catterick Garrison army base, which is rapidly becoming the largest population centre in Richmondshire. National chain retailers such as Lidl, WHSmith, Boots, and the Co-op, as well as local independent shops, restaurants and pubs, also provide a source of employment. The Gallowfields Trading Estate in the north of the town accommodates several builder's merchants, car garages and showrooms, a Royal Mail delivery office and a veterinarian surgery.

A traditional market still operates every Saturday in one of the largest cobbled market places in England, as well as a week round indoor one in the town's 19th-century market hall. The origins of the markets date back as far as 1093 when they were authorised by the Earls, and the first known royal charter was granted in 1155.

According to the 2011 United Kingdom census, the economic activity of residents aged 16–74 was 37.6% in full-time employment, 15.5% in part-time employment, 10.4% self-employed, 3.4% unemployed, 2.4% students with jobs, 3.6% students without jobs, 20% retired, 2.9% looking after home or family, 2.8% permanently sick or disabled, and 1.4% economically inactive for other reasons.

The average price of a house in Richmond for the 12-month period ending February 2020 was £241,583 compared to £223,537 for North Yorkshire and the national average of £232,320.

Landmarks
Richmond Castle in the town centre overlooks the River Swale and is a major tourist attraction, bringing in close to 40,000 visitors a year. Scolland's Hall is the gatehouse and was staffed by the Lords of Bedale, such as Bryan FitzAlan, Lord FitzAlan,  and Miles Stapleton, Founder KG. Other staff residences were Constable Burton and Thornton Steward.  Also, Richmond had an extended Wensleydale castlery initially consisting of Middleham Castle, Ravensworth and Snape (Baron FitzHugh & Neville Baron Latymer).  The Conyers, Wyville, Gascoigne, Stapleton and Lovell families were all notable gentry.

Within walking distance from the town centre are the ruins of the premonstratensian Easby Abbey, managed by English Heritage, and adjacent Easby Hall, built in 1729. A popular town legend tells the story of the Little Drummer Boy, a young member of an 18th-century regiment who was sent by soldiers to investigate a tunnel leading away from the castle towards Easby, playing his drum to guide the soldiers above ground, however the drums ceased suddenly and the boy was never seen or located since, a stone marker stands at the point at which the boy's drumming stopped, on a footpath between the town and Easby.

The tall market cross or "obelisk" was built in 1771 to replace the medieval cross that stood before it. On the south-west side of the town stands the folly of Culloden Tower, originally built in 1746 to commemorate the Duke of Cumberland's at the Battle of Culloden, after falling into disrepair it was restored in 1981 and now is used a holiday let. Another small folly is Oliver Duckett on the northern outskirts of the town, a rounded bastion tower, built from the same stone as Richmond Castle and now lying on public land.

Swale House on Frenchgate, built around 1750, was home to the headmaster and students of the nearby grammar school, before being used as a hospital for wounded officers in the First World War. For many years, it was the headquarters of Richmondshire District Council, before being closed and sold off in 2013. Millgate House bed & breakfast has received mentions in several national publications for its accompanying gardens.

There are two war memorials sited in Richmond, the Gallowgate Memorial stands overlooking Frenchgate, taking the form of a Celtic cross and is dedicated to the losses suffered by the Green Howards regiment during both the first and second world wars, the other monument commissioned is located in the friary gardens and commemorates all of the victims of the two world wars who resided in Richmond.

Richmond Falls are a short walk from the town centre and to the west of the town, on the road to Marske, is the unusually named Richmond Out Moor.

Religious sites 
There are four extant churches within the town, the Church of England's St Mary the Virgin, the Roman Catholic St Joseph and St Francis Xavier, Richmond Methodist Church  and Influence Church, formed in 1950 as Richmond Pentecostal Church. Former religious buildings and structures include Holy Trinity Church, a grade I Listed building in the centre of the market place, no longer conducting regular services, the 15th century bell tower of the former friary of Greyfriars, stands over an area of public green space, known as the Friary Gardens, and a former United Reformed Church building on Dundas Street.

Transport

Richmond Railway Station opened in 1846 and closed in 1968, a year before the branch line itself was taken out of service. After the station closed, the building was used for many years as a garden centre. It has now been renovated by the Richmondshire Building Preservation Trust and opened in late 2007, now titled "The Station", a mixed-use space for community and commercial activities.

The town is served by Arriva North East buses to Darlington and Catterick Garrison, as well as links to Barnard Castle and Northallerton provided by Hodgsons and routes to Leyburn and Ripon by Dales & District, along with council run services that serve Richmond's residential areas. The Little White Bus connects Richmond with the villages of Swaledale as far west as Keld and is operated solely by volunteer drivers.

Richmond has two four digit A-roads passing through it; the A6108 is the main entry route from the A1(M) junction at Scotch Corner, and continues west towards Leyburn and then Ripon. The A6136 connects to nearby Catterick Garrison across Mercury Bridge that spans the River Swale. Mercury Bridge is grade II listed, and as its original name of Station Bridge suggests, it was built to give vehicular access to the railway station. In June 2000, heavy flooding resulted in the bridge suffering considerable structural damage to one side, repairs were made at a cost of approximately £500,000 and the bridge re-opened to traffic in December of the same year.

Education
The town is home to two secondary schools: Richmond School, a large school and sixth form with specialisms in performing arts, science, and mathematics, and St Francis Xavier School, which is a smaller, voluntary aided, joint Roman Catholic and Church of England School for boys and girls aged 11–16.

There are also three non- sectarian primary schools: Trinity Academy (formerly Richmond C of E), Richmond Methodist School, and St Mary's Roman Catholic School.

Sport and culture

Sport 
The town's football club, Richmond Town F.C. was founded in 1945 and they currently play in the Wearside League in level 7 of the National League System  with their games being held at the Earl's Orchard ground, the pavilion was officially opened in March 1975 by then Middlesbrough F.C. manager Jack Charlton.

Richmond is also home to Richmondshire Rugby Union Football club, currently playing in Durham/Northumberland 3.

Richmondshire Cricket Club play in the North Yorkshire and South Durham Cricket League, where they have won the league title a total of five times and the ECB National Club Cricket Championship once, in 2018.

Richmond was also the starting point for the third stage of the 2018 Tour de Yorkshire road cycling race.

The town's racecourse opened in 1765 and closed in 1891, but the site is still used for horse training and by the public for walking. The poor condition of the grandstand led it to appear on Historic England's Heritage at Risk register in 2019.

Media and filmography 
The town is served by two local newspapers, North Yorkshire editions of the daily Northern Echo and the weekly Darlington & Stockton Times both published by Newsquest.

Richmond has been used as a filming location for a number of television programmes and films including The Fast Show, Century Falls, Earthfasts, A Woman of Substance (1984) and All Creatures Great and Small.

Arts 
The official gallery of Middlesbrough born artist Mackenzie Thorpe is located in town, Richmond local Lucy Pittaway was also chosen as the official artist for the Tour de Yorkshire from 2016 to 2018.

Richmondshire Concerts is a classical music society that puts on six concerts a year, generally of chamber music, at the Influence Church. The society has an average of 250 annual subscribers from North Yorkshire and the North East.

Richmond Live was an annual music festival held every August on a riverside venue known as "The Batts", notable headliners included The Lightning Seeds and The Hoosiers. The festival was cancelled permanently by the organisers following the 2019 event due to a lack of sustainability.

Cinema and theatre 
Richmond has a two-screen cinema that opened in 2007 in the former railway station the town was also home to the one screen Zetland Cinema, between from 1937 until its closure in 1983, the building was then sold to become a religious centre for the local Pentecostal Church, as of 2020 it is owned by the Influence Church, and also houses a food bank serving the local area.

The Georgian Theatre Royal in Richmond, built in 1788, is the UK's most complete 18th century theatre.  A decline in the fortunes of theatre led to closure in 1848 and it was used as a warehouse until 1963 when the theatre was restored and reopened, with a museum added in 1979, after renovation in 2003, a new block providing services and access was added next to the original auditorium.

Community 
The Richmond Meet is an annual fair taking place every Whit Monday, consisting of a parade and the arrival of amusement rides into the market place, in 2019 it ran for the 127th time, but was cancelled in 2020 and 2021 due to the COVID-19 pandemic.

Richmond has been twinned with Vinstra, Norway since 1988, and Saint-Aubin-du-Cormier, France since 2006.

Public services 
The town is served by the Friary Community Hospital, officially opened in 1999 and managed by South Tees Hospitals NHS Foundation Trust. It provides non-emergency care and general practice, the Victoria Ward in the hospital contains 18 beds, for purposes such as acute illnesses, rehabilitation and palliative care. The Victoria Hospital, served as a main health facility from when it opened as the Richmond Cottage Hospital in 1899 until its closure in 1999, coinciding with the opening of the Friary building, the premises is now in use as funeral director's offices, a few yards down the road from the old Victoria Hospital is the town's smaller general practitioner, the Quakers Lane Surgery.  The historic St. Nicholas house on the eastern outskirts of the town was once the site of a benedictine hospital dating back to 1137.

The local ambulances are run by the Yorkshire Ambulance Service, the town is also in the catchment area of the Great North Air Ambulance. North Yorkshire Police and North Yorkshire Fire and Rescue Service both have stations in the town within the same complex on I'Anson Road, water is supplied by Yorkshire Water.

Richmond Information Centre is based in the town's Victorian-era Market Hall. Having previously been run by Richmondshire District Council, RIC is now a non-profit volunteer-run organisation, dedicated to “welcoming visitors and locals alike”, which provides advice on attractions and services across a wide area, including the whole of the Yorkshire Dales National Park.

Notable people

Born in Richmond

 Rob Andrew, former rugby union international
 Peter Auty, opera singer who sang the song Walking In The Air from the TV film The Snowman
 George Bell, publisher, founder of George Bell & Sons
 Amanda Sonia Berry, CEO of BAFTA
 Francis Blackburne, archdeacon and dissenter
 John Brasse, writer
 William Brice, ethnographer
 Samuel and Nathaniel Buck, engravers and printmakers
 George Cuitt the Younger, painter
 George Errington, Roman Catholic archbishop
 John James Fenwick, founder of Fenwick's department stores
 Henry Greathead, inventor of the lifeboat
 Anthony Hammond, legal writer
 Thomas Harrison, architect
 Herbert Sedgwick, first class cricketer
 Theo Hutchcraft, one half of synth-pop duo, Hurts
 Francis Johnson, dissenter
 John Lawrence, 1st Baron Lawrence, viceroy of India
 Robert Lawrence Ottley, theologian
 Zoe Lee, European champion rower and Olympic silver medalist
 George McGuigan, rugby player
 Conyers Middleton, clergyman
 Tanya Bardsley, model
 Tim Rodber, rugby union international
 Edward Roper, first class cricketer
 Fran Summers, model
 James Tate, headmaster
 Thomas Taylor, clergyman

Residents

 Lord Baden-Powell, Founder of the scouting movement.
 Robert Barclay Allardice, pedestrian, educated at Richmond School.
 John Bathurst, physician to Oliver Cromwell.
 Marcus Beresford, Primate of All Ireland.
 Lewis Carroll, author, attended Richmond School, lived in nearby Croft-on-Tees.
 Henry Butler Clarke, historian of Spain
 J. R. Cohu, headmaster of Richmond School.
 Edward Ellerton, educational philanthropist, educated at Richmond School.
 Charles Grey, 2nd Earl Grey, British Prime Minister. Educated at Richmond School.
 Brenda Hale, Baroness Hale of Richmond, a Justice of the Supreme Court of the United Kingdom.
 Angela Harris, Baroness Harris of Richmond, Deputy Speaker in the House of Lords.
 Thomas Hounsfield, first class cricketer.
 Samuel Howitt, painter.
 Peter Inge, Baron Inge, former head of the British army and colonel of the Green Howards (1982–1994).
 Joanne Jackson, Olympic swimmer.
 Philip Mayne, last surviving British officer of the First World War.
 William Young Ottley, writer on art and collector. Educated at Richmond School.
 George Peacock, mathematician, attended a school in Richmond, one of "Tate's invincibles".
 Donald Peers, singer.
 James Raine, antiquarian, educated at Richmond School, one of "Tate's invincibles".
Peter Robinson, author, DCI Banks series
 Thomas Sedgwick, clergyman.
 Richard Sheepshanks, astronomer. Educated at Richmond School, one of "Tate's invincibles".
 T. H. Stokoe, head of Richmond school.
 Mackenzie Thorpe, artist.
 Stanley Vann, composer.
 John Warburton, herald and antiquary.
 Tim Clissold, author.

Arms

References

External links

  A History of Richmond : edited from Langdale's Yorkshire Dictionary (1822) and Baine's Directory of the County of York (1823).
  Robinson's Guide to Richmond (1833).
 A Brief History of Richmond
 Richmondshire Museum.
 Richmond Operatic Society.
  Official Guide to Richmond
 Richmondshire Building Preservation Trust

 
Market towns in North Yorkshire
Civil parishes in North Yorkshire
Swaledale
1071 establishments in England
Populated places established in the 11th century
Richmondshire
Towns in North Yorkshire